Richard Bryan (born 21 January 1977 in Bristol, Gloucestershire) is a former rugby union footballer for Leeds Carnegie (later Yorkshire Carnegie). He has also served as Player Development Manager and other roles in the Rugby Players Association (RPA).

His usual position was at the  back row . The Tykes signed Bryan from Newport Gwent Dragons in May 2006. He made his Tykes début against Nottingham R.F.C. on 1 October 2006 at Meadow Lane as a replacement in a 37-30 victory. "I am very pleased to be joining Leeds after a difficult few months in Wales," said Bryan on joining the club, "This will give me a chance to restart my career and the club share a lot of my ambitions. Next year will be a fresh start for the Tykes, with the amount of new players signing for the club and young players being promoted, and that is great for me. You cannot be anything other than very impressed by the set up here at the Tykes. The calibre of player we are signing bodes well for next season and trying to get back into the Premiership. I realise I will be one of the more experienced players in the squad but I am looking forward to that challenge, at my last couple of clubs that leadership role is something I have enjoyed."

Bryan began his career with Bath Rugby before moving on to skipper Bridgend. At the Brewery Field he led the club to the last Welsh Premiership title before the introduction of regional rugby with 13 league wins in 14 games. He also played five times in the Heineken Cup .

With the introduction of regional teams he was drafted into the Celtic Warriors side along with former Tyke Richard Parks . He moved to Newport following the demise of the Warriors in 2004 and made 23 appearances in the Celtic League in two seasons. Bryan took over the captaincy duties from Jason Forster .

In 2004 Bryan wondered whether he had any future in the game after clutching his knee in agony on the Rodney Parade pitch after falling awkwardly near the end of a game against Edinburgh .

A cruciate ligament had gone in the knee and a complete reconstruction was required with no certainty about the outcome. Ironically, it was fellow Tyke Rhys Oakley who replaced him in the Dragons' side.

But he recovered and he made a full return to the Newport side. Bryan said at the time: "The injury didn't even come through contact. I just sidestepped at the end of the game, right in the 80th minute, and it just went. I had never felt anything like it, I was in a huge amount of pain and felt pretty desperate.
"When I first did it I didn't realise how long it would be, maybe three or four months, so it was really hard. It was the longest I'd been out injured and it was a struggle watching all the boys playing, it was a case of trying to make the best of a bad job.
"But everyone at the club (Newport) was really good which helped me get through it, and I knew there were other players like Ben Breeze , Kevin Morgan and Peter Sidoli who had recovered from the same type of injury."

References

External links
Newport Gwent Dragons profile

English rugby union players
Bath Rugby players
Leeds Tykes players
Dragons RFC players
1977 births
Living people
Rugby union players from Bristol